Endocephalus is a genus of leaf beetles in the subfamily Eumolpinae. They are distributed in South America.

Species

 Endocephalus clytroides (Lefèvre, 1875)
 Endocephalus fasciatus Lefèvre, 1889
 Endocephalus femoralis (Lefèvre, 1875)
 Endocephalus flavipennis Guérin, 1855
 Endocephalus freyi Bechyné, 1950
 Endocephalus geniculatus Guérin, 1855
 Endocephalus lefevrei Harold, 1874
 Endocephalus lineatus (Fabricius, 1775)
 Endocephalus maronicus Bechyné, 1949
 Endocephalus militaris Jacoby, 1900
 Endocephalus nigripes Jacoby, 1900
 Endocephalus novogranadensis Bechyné, 1950
 Endocephalus octopunctatus (Germar, 1824)
 Endocephalus quadripunctatus Lefèvre, 1875
 Endocephalus spilotus Baly, 1865
 Endocephalus suffriani (Harold, 1874)
 Endocephalus suffriani paraguayensis (Jacoby, 1900)
 Endocephalus suffriani suffriani (Harold, 1874)
 Endocephalus tibialis Jacoby, 1900

Synonyms:
 Endocephalus biguttatus Lefèvre, 1875: synonym of Endocephalus flavipennis Guérin, 1855
 Endocephalus fenestratus Harold, 1874: synonym of Endocephalus flavipennis Guérin, 1855
 Endocephalus fulvicollis Lefèvre, 1891: synonym of Endocephalus suffriani (Harold, 1874)

References

Eumolpinae
Chrysomelidae genera
Beetles of South America
Taxa named by Louis Alexandre Auguste Chevrolat